Once Upon a Time is the seventh studio album by Taiwanese Mandopop girl group S.H.E. It was released on November 25, 2005, by HIM International Music. As of December 14, 2005, the album had shipped over 1 million copies across Asia.

This album features music styles with European myth elements such as a musical composition by Mozart in "不想長大" (Don't Wanna Grow Up) as well as Greek elements in the lyrics of "月桂女神" (Laurel Tree Goddess – Daphne). "Super Model" was used to promote Daphne Shoes' D18 line of shoes, while "Laurel Tree Goddess – Daphne" was a general promotional song. The track "星星之火" (Fires of Heaven) was composed by Malaysian Chinese singer-songwriter Gary Chaw.

The tracks "Super Model" was nominated for Top 10 Gold Songs and "不想長大" (Don't Wanna Grow Up) won Top 10 Gold Songs and Top 10 Gold Song Gold Award at the Hong Kong TVB8 Awards, presented by television station TVB8, in 2006.

At the song, Bu Xiang Zhang Da (不想长大), Don't Wanna Grow Up was given permission to be performed a special cover from Symphony No. 40 by Mozart.

Track listing
 "不想長大" Bu Xiang Zhang Da (Don't Wanna Grow Up) – 3:46
 "Super Model" – 3:36
 "不作你的朋友" Bu Zuo Ni De Peng You (Not Gonna Be Your Friend) (Cover of Someone's Watching Over Me - Hilary Duff) – 3:58 
 "天灰" Tian Hui (Grey Sky) – 4:03
 "月桂女神" Yue Gui Nü Shen (Laurel Tree Goddess – Daphne) (Cover of Dearest - Ayumi Hamasaki) – 5:13 
 "綠洲" Lü Zhou (Oasis) – 4:30
 "謝謝你讓我愛過你" Xie Xie Ni Rang Wo Ai Guo Ni (Thank You for Letting Me Love You) – 4:15
 "好人有好抱" Hao Ren You Hao Bao (Good People Will Rewarded in Kind) – 4:43
 "神槍手" Shen Qiang Shou (Sharpshooter) – 3:40
 "星星之火" Xing Xing Zhi Huo (Fires of Heaven) – 4:47

Music videos
Directed by Jay Chou, the music video for "Not Gonna Be Your Friend" touches upon themes of male homosexuality, unlike the video for "Belief" in Youth Society have the several couple of heterosexuality. Selina, Hebe and Ella are three girls who are fawning over a male friend of theirs, only to find out that the friend is gay and already has a boyfriend.

Chart positions

Top positions

Weeks on chart

N.B. None of the album's songs charted until January.

References

External links
  S.H.E discography@HIM International Music

2005 albums
S.H.E albums
HIM International Music albums